The shortlisted nominees for the 2021 Governor General's Awards for Literary Merit were announced on October 14, 2021, and the winners were announced on November 17. The 2021 awards returned to their traditional scheduling and presentation in the fall of the year, following the postponement of the 2020 Governor General's Awards to spring 2021 due to the COVID-19 pandemic in Canada.

English

French

References

External links
Governor General's Awards

Governor General's Awards
Governor General's Awards
Governor General's Awards